Ogyris amaryllis, the amaryllis azure or satin azure, is a butterfly in the family Lycaenidae. It is found in Australia.

The wingspan is about 35 mm. The upper surface of the wings is iridescent blue with black margins.

The larvae feed on Amyema species, including A. bifurcata, A. cambagei, A. congener, A. fitzgeraldii, A. linophyllum, A. lucasii, A. mackayensis, A. maidenii, A. melaleucae, A. miquelii, A. miraculosum, A. pendula, A. preissii, A. quandang, A. sanguinea and A. thalassium. Young larvae are green. Later, they become brown with diagonal markings. They are attended by various species of ants.

Subspecies
 O. a. amaryllis (New South Wales: Brisbane to Tuggerah)
 O. a. amata Waterhouse, 1934 (Canberra area)
 O. a. hewitsoni (Waterhouse, 1902) (Cairns to Maryborough)
 O. a. meridionalis Bethune-Baker, 1905 (eastern Australia and Western Australia)
 O. a. parsonsis Angel, 1951 (central Australia)

Image gallery

References

Butterflies described in 1862
Arhopalini